The Dolgellau transmitting station is a broadcasting and telecommunications facility located on a hill about 1 km north of the town of Dolgellau, in Gwynedd, Wales. It was originally built by the BBC, entering service just before Christmas 1967 acting as a relay transmitter for the now-defunct 405-line VHF television system.

Specifications
The site has a self-standing 22 m lattice tower erected on land that is itself about 100 m above sea level. The television broadcasts primarily cover the towns of Dolgellau, Llanelltyd and the villages of the upper Mawddach river valley.

625-line colour TV came to the site in the late 1970s.

The 405-line VHF television service closed across the UK in 1985, but Dolgellau's 405 line services closed early - in January 1984.

Dolgellau currently broadcasts digital television and analogue FM radio.

Services listed by frequency

Analogue television

18 December 1967 - Late 1970s
The transmitter was classed as a relay of Blaenplwyf about 40 km to the south, but received its signal from an SHF link fed from an off-air pickup on the coast at Barmouth about 10 km away to the west on the Mawddach estuary.

November 21st 1977 - 1 November 1982
Colour TV eventually arrived, with the site now additionally acting as an indirect relay of Preseli (about 100 km to the south) for the 625-line services, receiving its signal off-air from Llwyn Onn, which receives its signal off-air from Preseli itself.

1 November 1982 - January 1984
Channel 4 launched across the UK on 1 November 1982. Being in Wales, Dolgellau broadcast the S4C variant.

January 1984 - 19 August 2009
405-line television was discontinued (after a mere 17 years). For the next 25 years there were to be no changes to the television output at this site.

Analogue and Digital Television

19 August 2009 - 16 September 2009
Digital switchover started at Preseli and therefore at Dolgellau and all its other relays. BBC 2 was closed down on channel 62 and ITV 1 was moved from channel 59 to channel 62 for its final three weeks of service. Mux A started up on the newly vacated channel 59 at full post-DSO power.

Digital Television

16 September 2009 - 31 October 2012
All the remaining analogue TV transmitters were shut down and the three multiplexes of Freeview Lite took over their frequencies.

31 October 2012 - present
As part of the Europe-wide clearance of the 800 MHz band, the BBC Mux B signal was moved from channel 62- to channel 50.

Analogue radio (FM VHF)

18 December 1967 - Early 1990s
For its FM radio services, Dolgellau is an off-air relay of Blaenplwyf.

Early 1990s - present
Radio 1 gained its own frequency and National Radio 4 was added.

See also
List of masts
List of radio stations in the United Kingdom
List of tallest buildings and structures in Great Britain

References

External links
 MB21's page on BBC 405 TV to Wales and the West
 405 Alive's list of transmitters"
 More details on 405-line BBC transmitters
 The Transmission Gallery: Photographs and Information

Buildings and structures in Gwynedd
Transmitter sites in Wales
Dolgellau